Warming Up Yesterday's Lunch ( translit. Podgryavane na vcherashniya obed) is a 2002 Bulgarian — Macedonian drama film directed by Kostadin Bonev. It was entered into the 25th Moscow International Film Festival.

Cast
 Svetla Yancheva as Older Katerina (as Svetlana Yancheva)
Bilyana Kazakova as Young Katerina
 Mariya Mazneva as Katerina
 Snezhina Petrova as Tzena
 Rousy Chanev as Grandpa Vande (as Rusi Chanev)
 Atanass Atanassov as Kiril Vandev
 Galin Stoev as The Director
 Dossio Dossev as Bozhin
Nikolay Mutafchiev as young Bozhin
 Stoyan Sardanov as Leshko

References

External links
 

2002 films
2002 drama films
2000s Bulgarian-language films
Bulgarian drama films
Macedonian drama films